FS Class 122 were  steam locomotives with tenders, designed for hauling passenger trains. The Italian State Railways (FS) acquired 32 of them as war reparations after World War I from the Austrian Südbahn (SB).

History
Following the reparations resulting from the First World War, 32 units arrived at the Italian FS, which classified them as Class 122. Deliveries took place in two phases: 23 units were delivered by 1919, while the other nine were delivered following subsequent agreements between 1922 and 1923 concerning the territorial distribution of the railway lines and Sudbahn plants. Being obsolete machines, they were soon withdrawn and had been scrapped by the end of the 1920s.

Technical details
The locomotives had a  wheel arrangement.  The engine was simple expansion with two outside cylinders and outside Stephenson valve gear. The tender had three axles.

Numbering

References

Further reading
 
 
 

2-4-0 locomotives
Railway locomotives introduced in 1869
Standard gauge locomotives of Italy
122
Passenger locomotives